Leandre Dal Ponte (born 20 December 1975), sometimes known more simply as Leandre, is a Brazilian politician and civil engineer. She has spent her political career representing her home state of Paraná, having served as state representative from 2015.

Personal life
She is the daughter of Nadilo Dal Ponte and Maria Selvina. Prior to becoming a politician Pal Ponte worked as a civil engineer, and is an alumnus of Universidade Positivo. From 1997 to 2000 she served as the municipal secretary of health for the municipality of Saudade do Iguaçu.

Political career
Dal Ponte voted in favor of the impeachment motion of then-president Dilma Rousseff. She would later vote in favor of opening a similar corruption investigation against Rousseff's successor Michel Temer, and voted in favor of the proposed 2017 Brazilian labor reforms.

References

1975 births
Living people
People from Pato Branco
Green Party (Brazil) politicians
Brazilian women in politics
Members of the Chamber of Deputies (Brazil) from Paraná